Progaleopithecus is an extinct genus of interatheriid notoungulate that lived during the Late Oligocene of Argentina. Fossils of this genus have been found in the Agua de la Piedra, Deseado, and Sarmiento Formations of Argentina.

Taxonomy 
Progaleopithecus was first named in 1904 by Florentino Ameghino based on remains found in the Sarmiento Formation of Argentina, dating to the Late Oligocene, around 28 to 23 mya. It is a derived member of the Interatheriidae, within the subfamily Interatheriinae.

The following cladogram of the Interatheriinae is based on Vera et al. 2017, showing the position of Progaleopithecus.

References 

Typotheres
Prehistoric placental genera
Oligocene mammals of South America
Deseadan
Paleogene Argentina
Fossils of Argentina
Taxa named by Florentino Ameghino
Fossil taxa described in 1904
Golfo San Jorge Basin
Sarmiento Formation